Ata-ur-Rehman (born 29 October 1986) is a Pakistani cricketer. He played in 39 first-class and 9 List A matches between 2009 and 2014. He made his Twenty20 debut on 10 February 2014, for Quetta Bears in the 2013–14 National T20 Cup.

References

External links
 

1986 births
Living people
Pakistani cricketers
Quetta cricketers
Quetta Bears cricketers
Place of birth missing (living people)